is a 2004 anime fantasy action-adventure film directed by Kazuhisa Takenouchi and written by Yoshiyuki Suga. It is the fifth feature film in the One Piece film series which mostly focuses on Roronoa Zoro.

Plot
Zoro is lured away from the crew by henchmen of his childhood friend Saga. In search of Zoro, the Straw Hats encounter the young priestess Maya. Luffy and Usopp becomes lost and meet Saga, while Saga's men attack Maya's village. Zoro, alongside them, takes three purple orbs from Maya, which none of Saga's men can touch. Luffy fights Saga, but during the encounter falls off a high cliff, causing Usopp to jump after him. Zoro returns to Saga with the orbs and disposes of them in a well. 

Luffy and Usopp find a tunnel system and explore it where they stumble upon the orbs and take them along. While in the village the remaining Straw Hats hear about the evil Seven-Star Sword, that has taken control of Saga, and the stolen orbs needed to seal the sword's power, when Luffy and Usopp emerge from the ground in front of them. After hearing the story, the Straw Hats decide to help. Zoro learns that Saga is controlled by the Seven-Star Sword and that Saga plans to make him the sword's first sacrifice. They start a fight during which Zoro attempts to destroy the cursed blade. 

Using the orbs, Maya performs a ritual to keep the sword's power from fully awakening. Saga defeats Zoro, but before he can kill him, the ritual catches his attention and hurries to interrupt it. With the sword's power unfolding, Saga fights Luffy a second time. During their fight, the sword crumbles and its power is transferred into Saga's body. Zoro appears where he takes over for Luffy, and defeats his Saga. After the cursed power leaves Saga's body and his mind is freed from the evil influence, the Straw Hats set sail for their next adventure.

Cast
Kazuya Nakai as Roronoa Zoro
Mayumi Tanaka as Monkey D. Luffy
Akemi Okamura as Nami
Kappei Yamaguchi as Usopp
Hiroaki Hirata as Sanji
Ikue Ōtani as Tony Tony Chopper
Yuriko Yamaguchi as Nico Robin
Ryouka Yuzuki as Maya
Shidou Nakamura as Saga
Masami Hisamoto as Izaya
Hiroki Uchi as Toma
Seiji Sasaki as Bismark
Takeshi Aono as Boo Kong

Film comic
Shueisha created a film comic adaptation of the film, titled  and released it in two volumes on July 2, 2004 ( and ).

First volume chapter list

Second volume chapter list
<li>
<li>
<li>
<li>

Notes

References

External links
 Official website of Toei Animation 

2004 anime films
Toei Animation films
Cursed Holy Sword, The
Films scored by Kohei Tanaka
Films scored by Shirō Hamaguchi

ru:Список анимационных фильмов о One Piece#Фильм пятый